Vitaly Alexandrovich Shevchenko (Russian: Виталий Александрович Шевченко) is a Ukrainian journalist. Since 2012 he has worked for BBC Monitoring, specialising in the former Soviet Union. He is a regular contributor to the BBC Podcast, Ukrainecast.

References

BBC newsreaders and journalists
Ukrainian journalists
Living people
Year of birth missing (living people)